Sky Patrol is a 1939 American film directed by Howard Bretherton and starring John Trent, along with Marjorie Reynolds, Milburn Stone and Jason Robards Sr. The film also featured actor and comedian Jackie Coogan, who began his film career as a child actor in silent films.

Sky Patrol is based on the comic strip Tailspin Tommy by Hal Forrest and Glenn Chaffin.  The third of four "Tailspin Tommy" films made by Monogram Pictures, Sky Patrolwas released on September 12, 1939.

Plot
In the final flying test for Sky Patrol graduation, instructor Tailspin Tommy Thompson (John Trent) flies with the son of flight commander Colonel Meade (Boyd Irwin). Carter Meade (Jackie Coogan) freezes during target practice but Tommy covers for him and he graduates.

When Bainbridge (Bryant Washburn), a weapons smuggler, is aware that the Sky Patrol will disrupt his smuggling operations. Carter sees an unidentified amphibious aircraft but is unable to fire on it and is shot down by Bainbridge, who takes him prisoner.

Carter is presumed dead but Tommy and Skeeter Milligan (Milburn Stone) locate a warehouse where the amphibious aircraft is hidden. Tracking the unknown aircraft to a ship rendezvous, Tommy and Skeeter try to get on board but are captured and locked up with Carter.

Monitoring the Sky Patrol radio, the smugglers learn the colonel and the Sky Patrol are heading for the ship. Tommy manages to set up explosives in the hold, and when the three prisoners are about to jump ship, Carter shoots a smuggler, ensuring their escape. The Colonel soon overpowers the rest of Bainbridge's men.

Tommy and Skeeter return to their commercial airline jobs, leaving Carter now in charge of the Sky Patrol.

Cast

 John Trent as Tailspin Tommy Tomkins
 Marjorie Reynolds as Betty Lou Barnes
 Milburn Stone as Skeeter Milligan
 Jackie Coogan as Carter Meade
 Jason Robards Sr. as Paul Smith, Three Points Airfield Owner
 Bryant Washburn as Bainbridge
 Boyd Irwin as Colonel Meade
 LeRoy Mason as Mitch
 Hans Joby as Jackson
 John Daheim as Ryan
 Dickie Jones as Bobbie

Production
Principal photography for Sky Patrol took place at the Los Angeles Metropolitan Airport, from July 24 to late September 1939.

The aircraft used in Sky Patrol include:
 Douglas Dolphin 1 
 Travel Air 2000
 Travel Air 4000
 Waco GXE

Reception
Aviation film historian Stephen Pendo in Aviation in the Cinema (1985) saw Sky Patrol delving into familiar territory of "flying police". Earlier, Criminals of the Air (1937). Death in the Sky (also known as Pilot X) (1937), Reported Missing (1937), Mysterious Pilot (film serial) (1937 and Secret Service of the Air (1939) all dealt with similar scenarios of air police fighting criminals both on the ground and in the air.

References

Notes

Citations

Bibliography

 Farmer, James H. Celluloid Wings: The Impact of Movies on Aviation. Blue Ridge Summit, Pennsylvania: Tab Books Inc., 1984. .
 Pendo, Stephen. Aviation in the Cinema. Lanham, Maryland: Scarecrow Press, 1985. .
 Wynne, H. Hugh. The Motion Picture Stunt Pilots and Hollywood's Classic Aviation Movies. Missoula, Montana: Pictorial Histories Publishing Co., 1987. .

External links
 
 

1939 films
1939 adventure films
American black-and-white films
Monogram Pictures films
American adventure films
American aviation films
Films directed by Howard Bretherton
1930s English-language films
1930s American films